Michael S. Ledwidge is an American author of Irish descent. He wrote his first novel, The Narrowback, while working as the back elevator operator for a Park Avenue Coop apartment building.  His novel, Bad Connection was written while working as a lineman for the telephone company in NYC.  His most successful writing has been several books he has co-authored with the best-selling author James Patterson.

Bibliography

References

21st-century American novelists
American male novelists
Living people
1971 births
Writers from the Bronx
21st-century American male writers
Novelists from New York (state)